

Hans-Georg Benthack (2 March 1894 – 17 August 1973) was a general in the Wehrmacht of Nazi Germany during World War II. He was a recipient of the Knight's Cross of the Iron Cross.

Awards and decorations

 Knight's Cross of the Iron Cross on 10 May 1945 as Generalmajor and commander of Festungs-Division Kreta

Notes

References

Citations

Bibliography

 
 

1894 births
1973 deaths
Military personnel from Hamburg
Major generals of the German Army (Wehrmacht)
German Army personnel of World War I
Recipients of the clasp to the Iron Cross, 1st class
Recipients of the Knight's Cross of the Iron Cross
German prisoners of war in World War II held by the United Kingdom
Crete in World War II
People acquitted of manslaughter